Nickolas Andrew Halliwell Grace (born 21 November 1947) is an English actor known for his roles on television, including Anthony Blanche in the acclaimed ITV adaptation of Brideshead Revisited, and the Sheriff of Nottingham in the 1980s series Robin of Sherwood. Grace also played Dorien Green's husband Marcus Green in the 1990s British comedy series Birds of a Feather.

Early life and career
Grace was educated at the King's School, Chester and Forest School, Walthamstow. He trained as an actor at the Central School of Speech and Drama, where he still teaches.

He made his theatrical debut in weekly rep in Frinton-on-Sea, Essex in 1969, and appeared in Trevor Peacock's Erb later that year, which transferred to the Strand Theatre in spring 1970, his first appearance in the West End. He joined the Royal Shakespeare Company in 1972, and in 1973 played Aumerle there in the Ian Richardson/Richard Pasco Richard II, which transferred to Broadway.

Grace then played Hamlet for the opening of the Playhouse, Derby in 1975. Back at the RSC, from 1976 to 1978 he appeared as Dromio of Ephesus in Trevor Nunn's first ever musical, The Comedy of Errors (with Judi Dench, Michael Williams and Roger Rees), Hitler in Schweik and Witwoud in The Way of the World, directed by John Barton.

Brideshead Revisited
Grace secured the part of the flamboyant aesthete Anthony Blanche in Brideshead Revisited, which filmed off and on from 1979 to 1981. Following the success of Brideshead Revisited on television, he played Richard II at the Young Vic in 1981, and Mozart in Amadeus with Frank Finlay at Her Majesty's Theatre in 1982. He then began working in operetta, playing Koko in The Mikado and Joseph Porter in HMS Pinafore for Sadler's Wells Opera in repertoire from 1982 until 1986.

Grace was Harry Hamilton-Paul in the film Heat and Dust (1983). It was around this time that he took the role of Robert de Rainault, the Sheriff of Nottingham, in ITV's Robin of Sherwood (1984–86).

Grace's theatre work in the late 1980s and early 1990s included Jenkins' Ear by Dusty Hughes at the Royal Court in 1986, Bernstein's Candide (Old Vic/Scottish Opera/BBC) in 1988–89 and The Mystery of Irma Vep at the Haymarket Theatre, Leicester (1990), which transferred to the Ambassadors Theatre. He played Cole Porter in A Swell Party at the Vaudeville in 1991–92 and appeared in Ken Russell's production of Princess Ida for ENO at the Coliseum Theatre in 1992.

1993–present
Following a recurring role in 1993 as the unnamed 'Consultant' on Victor Lewis-Smith's loosely hospital-based sketch show Inside Victor Lewis-Smith, Grace played Marcus Green, the long-suffering husband of Dorien in Birds of a Feather, in a couple of episodes between 1989 and 1997. He has also appeared three times as Mr Casey in the BBC Sitcom My Family.

Grace played Underling the Butler in The Drowsy Chaperone with Elaine Paige at the Novello Theatre, which ended its run on 4 August 2007. On 29 July 2009 he appeared on the UK version of Dragons Den as the proposed director of a new touring musical based around the life of Dusty Springfield.

He had a recurring role in some Doctor Who audio stories, produced by Big Finish as a Time Lord ally; Straxus, of the Eighth Doctor and Lucie Miller, (Paul McGann and Sheridan Smith) in the stories Human Resources, Sisters of the Flame and Vengeance of Morbius.

He portrayed Albert Einstein in the Doctor Who short "Death is the Only Answer".

In 2012, Grace starred in Chariots of Fire, the stage adaptation of the film of the same title. In it he played the Master of Trinity College at Cambridge University, the role originated on screen by John Gielgud.

Grace is President of the Vic-Wells Association.

TV and filmography

References

External links

Nickolas Grace at Theatricalia

1947 births
Alumni of the Royal Central School of Speech and Drama
English male film actors
English male stage actors
English male television actors
Living people
People educated at Forest School, Walthamstow
People educated at The King's School, Chester
Royal Shakespeare Company members
20th-century English male actors
21st-century English male actors
People from West Kirby
Actors from Cheshire